Bahiria latevalvata is a species of snout moth in the genus Bahiria. It was described by Boris Balinsky in 1994 and is found in South Africa.

References

Moths described in 1994
Phycitini